Aerodrom (also known as Jurica Pađen & Aerodrom) is a Croatian rock band from Zagreb.

Aerodrom was founded in 1978 by Jurica Pađen, former member of rock bands Grupa 220 and Parni valjak. Aerodrom saw its greatest success in the early 1980s. Between 1979 and 1986 the band produced five studio albums, before disbanding in 1987.

Between 1987 and 1990, Pađen was a member of Azra. In 1994, he formed Pađen band. In 2001, he launched a comeback of Aerodrom, with two of the band's original members. Since then Aerodrom has released four studio albums, a live album, a best-of compilation album and a box set of their first 5 albums from the 1980s.

Members 
Current members
Jurica Pađen - Guitars, vocals
Tomislav Šojat - Bass guitar
Ivan Havidić - Guitars
Damir Medić - Drums

Past members
Remo Cartagine – Bass
Zlatan Živković – Lead vocals, percussions, drums, keyboards
Mladen Krajnik – Keyboards
Zoran Kraš – Keyboards
Paolo Sfeci – Drums
Branko Knežević – Drums
Nenad Smoljanović – Drums, percussions
Slavko Pintarić 'Pišta' – Drums

Timeline

Discography

Studio albums
Kad misli mi vrludaju (Jugoton, 1979)
Tango bango (Jugoton, 1981)
Obične ljubavne pjesme (Jugoton, 1982)
Dukat i pribadače (Jugoton, 1984)
Trojica u mraku (Jugoton, 1986)
Na travi (Croatia Records, 2001)
Rock @ Roll (Croatia Records, 2007)
Taktika noja (Menart, 2012)
Dnevni rituali (Croatia Records, 2019)

Live albums
Hitovi i legende (Croatia Records, 2009)

Compilations
Flash Back 1979-1986 (Croatia Records, 1996)
The Ultimate Collection (Croatia Records, 2008)
Greatest Hits (Croatia Records, 2020)

Box Sets
The Original Album Collection (Croatia Records, 2018)

See also
Music of Croatia
SFR Yugoslav pop and rock scene

References

14.studenog Jurica Pađen & Aerodrom u "Tvornici kulture"

External links 

 Official Youtube channel

Croatian rock music groups

Croatian new wave musical groups
Yugoslav rock music groups
Croatian progressive rock groups
Musical groups established in 1978
Articles which contain graphical timelines
Musicians from Zagreb
1978 establishments in Yugoslavia